A Gift from Nessus is a novel by the Scottish writer William McIlvanney published in 1968 and republished in 2014.

The novel in 1968 was awarded a Scottish Arts Council Book Award and it was adapted by Bill Craig for the BBC series Play for Today in 1980.

References

Scottish novels
1968 British novels
Novels by William McIlvanney
Eyre & Spottiswoode books